Parrish J. Smith (born May 13, 1968), better known as PMD ('Parrish Mic Doc' or 'Parrish Making Dollars'), is an American rapper from Brentwood, New York, a member of EPMD and Hit Squad.

Career 
He attended Brentwood High School, and has released four full-length solo albums, one extended play, seven EPMD albums with Erick Sermon, a collaborative album with Japanese hip hop producer DJ Honda, and a collaborative project with Sean Strange and German hip hop group Snowgoons.

Discography

Solo albums

EPs

Collaborative albums

Charted singles

References

External links 

1968 births
African-American male rappers
Brentwood High School (Brentwood, New York) alumni
Def Jam Recordings artists
EPMD members
Living people
Rappers from New York (state)
Place of birth missing (living people)
21st-century American rappers
21st-century American male musicians
21st-century African-American musicians
20th-century African-American people